Armadillo Hill is an ice-covered hill in Antarctica which rises to  and projects  above the surrounding ice sheet. First roughly surveyed by the British Graham Land Expedition, 1934–37, it was resurveyed in 1940 by sledging parties of the United States Antarctic Service on whose field charts the hill is labelled "Sawtooth". It was named Armadillo Hill by the Falkland Islands Dependencies Survey following its 1946–47 survey, because when viewed from the northeast the tumbled ice blocks on the summit and general shape of the hill resemble the side view of an armadillo.

References 

Hills of Graham Land
Fallières Coast